In mathematics, a root system is a configuration of vectors in a Euclidean space satisfying certain geometrical properties. The concept is fundamental in the theory of Lie groups and Lie algebras, especially the classification and representation theory of semisimple Lie algebras. Since Lie groups (and some analogues such as algebraic groups) and Lie algebras have become important in many parts of mathematics during the twentieth century, the apparently special nature of root systems belies the number of areas in which they are applied.  Further, the classification scheme for root systems, by Dynkin diagrams, occurs in parts of mathematics with no overt connection to Lie theory (such as singularity theory).  Finally, root systems are important for their own sake, as in spectral graph theory.

Definitions and examples

As a first example, consider the six vectors in 2-dimensional Euclidean space, R2, as shown in the image at the right; call them roots. These vectors span the whole space. If you consider the line perpendicular to any root, say β, then the reflection of R2 in that line sends any other root, say α, to another root. Moreover, the root to which it is sent equals α + nβ, where n is an integer (in this case, n equals 1). These six vectors satisfy the following definition, and therefore they form a root system; this one is known as A2.

Definition
A root system  in E is a finite set of non-zero vectors (called roots) that satisfy the following conditions:

 The roots span E.

An equivalent way of writing conditions 3 and 4 is as follows:

 For any two roots , the set  contains the element 
 For any two roots , the number  is an integer.

Some authors only include conditions 1–3 in the definition of a root system.  In this context, a root system that also satisfies the integrality condition is known as a crystallographic root system.  Other authors omit condition 2; then they call root systems satisfying condition 2 reduced.  In this article, all root systems are assumed to be reduced and crystallographic.

In view of property 3, the integrality condition is equivalent to stating that β and its reflection σα(β) differ by an integer multiple of α. Note that the operator

defined by property 4 is not an inner product. It is not necessarily symmetric and is linear only in the first argument. 

The rank of a root system Φ is the dimension of E.  
Two root systems may be combined by regarding the Euclidean spaces they span as mutually orthogonal subspaces of a common Euclidean space.  A root system which does not arise from such a combination, such as the systems A2, B2, and G2 pictured to the right, is said to be irreducible.

Two root systems (E1, Φ1) and (E2, Φ2) are called isomorphic if there is an invertible linear transformation E1 → E2 which sends Φ1 to Φ2 such that for each pair of roots, the number  is preserved.

The  of a root system Φ is the Z-submodule of E generated by Φ. It is a lattice in E.

Weyl group

The group of isometries of E generated by reflections through hyperplanes associated to the roots of Φ is called the Weyl group of Φ. As it acts faithfully on the finite set Φ, the Weyl group is always finite. The Weyl group is the symmetry group of an equilateral triangle, which has six elements. In this case, the Weyl group is not the full symmetry group of the root system (e.g., a 60-degree rotation is a symmetry of the root system but not an element of the Weyl group).

Rank one example

There is only one root system of rank 1, consisting of two nonzero vectors . This root system is called .

Rank two examples

Note that a root system is not determined by the lattice that it generates:  and  both generate a square lattice while  and  both generate a hexagonal lattice.

Whenever Φ is a root system in E, and S is a subspace of E spanned by Ψ = Φ ∩ S, then Ψ is a root system in S.  Thus, the exhaustive list of four root systems of rank 2 shows the geometric possibilities for any two roots chosen from a root system of arbitrary rank.  In particular, two such roots must meet at an angle of 0, 30, 45, 60, 90, 120, 135, 150, or 180 degrees.

Root systems arising from semisimple Lie algebras

We say that  is a root of  relative to  if  and there exists some  such that

for all . One can show that there is an inner product for which the set of roots forms a root system. (See the section below on Root systems and Lie theory.)

History
The concept of a root system was originally introduced by Wilhelm Killing around 1889 (in German, Wurzelsystem). He used them in his attempt to classify all simple Lie algebras over the field of complex numbers. Killing originally made a mistake in the classification, listing two exceptional rank 4 root systems, when in fact there is only one, now known as F4. Cartan later corrected this mistake, by showing Killing's two root systems were isomorphic.

Killing investigated the structure of a Lie algebra , by considering what is now called a Cartan subalgebra . Then he studied the roots of the characteristic polynomial , where . This set of roots form a root system inside , as defined above, where the inner product is the Killing form.

Elementary consequences of the root system axioms

The cosine of the angle between two roots is constrained to be one-half of the square root of a positive integer.

Condition 2 says that no scalar multiples of α other than 1 and −1 can be roots, so 0 or 180°, which would correspond to 2α or  −2α, are out.

In summary, here are the only possibilities for each pair of roots.
Angle of 90 degrees; in that case, the length ratio is unrestricted.
Angle of 60 or 120 degrees, with a length ratio of 1.

Positive roots and simple roots

Given a root system  we can always choose (in many ways) a set of positive roots. This is a subset  of  such that 
 For any two distinct  such that  is a root, .

Furthermore, every set of positive roots arises in this way.

For each , the coefficients in the previous point are either all non-negative or all non-positive.

For each root system  there are many different choices of the set of positive roots—or, equivalently, of the simple roots—but any two sets of positive roots differ by the action of the Weyl group.

Dual root system, coroots, and integral elements

The dual root system
If Φ is a root system in E, the coroot α∨ of a root α is defined by

The set of coroots also forms a root system Φ∨ in E, called the dual root system (or sometimes inverse root system).
By definition,  α∨ ∨ = α, so that Φ is the dual root system of Φ∨. The lattice in E spanned by  Φ∨ is called the coroot lattice. Both Φ and Φ∨ have the same Weyl group W and, for s in W,

If Δ is a set of simple roots for Φ, then Δ∨ is a set of simple roots for Φ∨.

In the classification described below, the root systems of type  and  along with the exceptional root systems  are all self-dual, meaning that the dual root system is isomorphic to the original root system.

Integral elements

A vector  in E is called integral if its inner product with each coroot is an integer:

The set of integral elements is called the weight lattice associated to the given root system. This term comes from the representation theory of semisimple Lie algebras, where the integral elements form the possible weights of finite-dimensional representations.

The definition of a root system guarantees that the roots themselves are integral elements. Thus, every integer linear combination of roots is also integral. In most cases, however, there will be integral elements that are not integer combinations of roots. That is to say, in general the weight lattice does not coincide with the root lattice.

Classification of root systems by Dynkin diagrams

Irreducible root systems correspond to certain graphs, the Dynkin diagrams named after Eugene Dynkin. The classification of these graphs is a simple matter of combinatorics, and induces a classification of irreducible root systems.

Constructing the Dynkin diagram

Given a root system, select a set Δ of simple roots as in the preceding section. The vertices of the associated Dynkin diagram correspond to the roots in Δ.  Edges are drawn between vertices as follows, according to the angles. (Note that the angle between simple roots is always at least 90 degrees.)
No edge if the vectors are orthogonal,
An undirected single edge if they make an angle of 120 degrees,
A directed double edge if they make an angle of 135 degrees, and 
A directed triple edge if they make an angle of 150 degrees.  
The term "directed edge" means that double and triple edges are marked with an arrow pointing toward the shorter vector. (Thinking of the arrow as a "greater than" sign makes it clear which way the arrow is supposed to point.)

Note that by the elementary properties of roots noted above, the rules for creating the Dynkin diagram can also be described as follows. No edge if the roots are orthogonal; for nonorthogonal roots, a single, double, or triple edge according to whether the length ratio of the longer to shorter is 1, . In the case of the  root system for example, there are two simple roots at an angle of 150 degrees (with a length ratio of ). Thus, the Dynkin diagram has two vertices joined by a triple edge, with an arrow pointing from the vertex associated to the longer root to the other vertex. (In this case, the arrow is a bit redundant, since the diagram is equivalent whichever way the arrow goes.)

Classifying root systems
Although a given root system has more than one possible set of simple roots, the Weyl group acts transitively on such choices. Consequently, the Dynkin diagram is independent of the choice of simple roots; it is determined by the root system itself. Conversely, given two root systems with the same Dynkin diagram, one can match up roots, starting with the roots in the base, and show that the systems are in fact the same.

Thus the problem of classifying root systems reduces to the problem of classifying possible Dynkin diagrams. A root systems is irreducible if and only if its Dynkin diagrams is connected. The possible connected diagrams are as indicated in the figure. The subscripts indicate the number of vertices in the diagram (and hence the rank of the corresponding irreducible root system).

Weyl chambers and the Weyl group

If  is a root system, we may consider the hyperplane perpendicular to each root . Recall that  denotes the reflection about the hyperplane and that the Weyl group is the group of transformations of  generated by all the 's. The complement of the set of hyperplanes is disconnected, and each connected component is called a Weyl chamber. If we have fixed a particular set Δ of simple roots, we may define the fundamental Weyl chamber associated to Δ as the set of points  such that  for all .

Since the reflections  preserve , they also preserve the set of hyperplanes perpendicular to the roots. Thus, each Weyl group element permutes the Weyl chambers.

The figure illustrates the case of the  root system. The "hyperplanes" (in this case, one dimensional) orthogonal to the roots are indicated by dashed lines. The six 60-degree sectors are the Weyl chambers and the shaded region is the fundamental Weyl chamber associated to the indicated base.

A basic general theorem about Weyl chambers is this:
Theorem: The Weyl group acts freely and transitively on the Weyl chambers. Thus, the order of the Weyl group is equal to the number of Weyl chambers.
In the  case, for example, the Weyl group has six elements and there are six Weyl chambers.

A related result is this one:
Theorem: Fix a Weyl chamber .

Root systems and Lie theory
Irreducible root systems classify a number of related objects in Lie theory, notably the following:
simple complex Lie algebras (see the discussion above on root systems arising from semisimple Lie algebras),
simply connected complex Lie groups which are simple modulo centers, and
simply connected compact Lie groups which are simple modulo centers.
In each case, the roots are non-zero weights of the adjoint representation.

A preliminary result says that a semisimple Lie algebra is simple if and only if the associated root system is irreducible. We thus restrict attention to irreducible root systems and simple Lie algebras.

First, we must establish that for each simple algebra  there is only one root system.
Next, we need to show that for each irreducible root system, there can be at most one Lie algebra, that is, that the root system determines the Lie algebra up to isomorphism. 
Finally, we must show that for each irreducible root system, there is an associated simple Lie algebra. This claim is obvious for the root systems of type A, B, C, and D, for which the associated Lie algebras are the classical Lie algebras. It is then possible to analyze the exceptional algebras in a case-by-case fashion. Alternatively, one can develop a systematic procedure for building a Lie algebra from a root system, using Serre's relations.

For connections between the exceptional root systems and their Lie groups and Lie algebras see E8, E7, E6, F4, and G2.

Properties of the irreducible root systems

Irreducible root systems are named according to their corresponding connected Dynkin diagrams. There are four infinite families (An, Bn, Cn, and Dn, called the classical root systems) and five exceptional cases (the exceptional root systems). The subscript indicates the rank of the root system.

In an irreducible root system there can be at most two values for the length (α, α)1/2, corresponding to short and long roots. If all roots have the same length they are taken to be long by definition and the root system is said to be simply laced; this occurs in the cases A, D and E. Any two roots of the same length lie in the same orbit of the Weyl group. In the non-simply laced cases B, C, G and F, the root lattice is spanned by the short roots and the long roots span a sublattice, invariant under the Weyl group, equal to r2/2 times the coroot lattice, where r is the length of a long root.

In the adjacent table, |Φ<| denotes the number of short roots, I denotes the index in the root lattice of the sublattice generated by long roots, D denotes the determinant of the Cartan matrix, and |W| denotes the order of the Weyl group.

Explicit construction of the irreducible root systems

An

Let E be the subspace of Rn+1 for which the coordinates sum to 0, and let Φ be the set of vectors in E of length  and which are integer vectors, i.e. have integer coordinates in Rn+1. Such a vector must have all but two coordinates equal to 0, one coordinate equal to 1, and one equal to −1, so there are n2 + n roots in all.

The reflection σi through the hyperplane perpendicular to αi is the same as permutation of the adjacent ith and (i + 1)th coordinates. Such 
transpositions generate the full permutation group.
For adjacent simple roots, 
σi(αi+1) = αi+1 + αi = σi+1(αi) = αi + αi+1, that is, reflection is equivalent to adding a multiple of 1; but
reflection of a simple root perpendicular to a nonadjacent simple root leaves it unchanged, differing by a multiple of 0.

The An root lattice – that is, the lattice generated by the An roots – is most easily described as the set of integer vectors in Rn+1 whose components sum to zero.

The A2 root lattice is the vertex arrangement of the triangular tiling.

The A3 root lattice is known to crystallographers as the face-centered cubic (or cubic close packed) lattice. It is the vertex arrangement of the tetrahedral-octahedral honeycomb.

The A3 root system (as well as the other rank-three root systems) may be modeled in the Zometool Construction set.

In general, the An root lattice is the vertex arrangement of the n-dimensional simplectic honeycomb.

Bn

The total number of roots is 2n2.

The reflection σn through the hyperplane perpendicular to the short root αn is of course simply negation of the nth coordinate. 
For the long simple root αn−1, σn−1(αn) = αn + αn−1, but for reflection perpendicular to the short root, σn(αn−1) = αn−1 + 2αn, a difference by a multiple of 2 instead of 1.

The Bn root lattice—that is, the lattice generated by the Bn roots—consists of all integer vectors.

Cn

Let E = Rn, and let Φ consist of all integer vectors in E of length  together with all vectors of the form 2λ, where λ is an integer vector of length 1.  The total number of roots is 2n2. One choice of simple roots is: αi = ei − ei+1, for 1 ≤ i ≤ n − 1 (the above choice of simple roots for An−1), and the longer root αn = 2en.
The reflection σn(αn−1) = αn−1 + αn, but σn−1(αn) = αn + 2αn−1.

The Cn root lattice—that is, the lattice generated by the Cn roots—consists of all integer vectors whose components sum to an even integer.

Dn

Let , and let Φ consist of all integer vectors in E of length .

Reflection through the hyperplane perpendicular to αn is the same as transposing and negating the adjacent n-th and (n − 1)-th coordinates. Any simple root and its reflection perpendicular to another simple root differ by a multiple of 0 or 1 of the second root, not by any greater multiple.

The Dn root lattice – that is, the lattice generated by the Dn roots – consists of all integer vectors whose components sum to an even integer.  This is the same as the Cn root lattice.

The Dn roots are expressed as the vertices of a rectified n-orthoplex, Coxeter–Dynkin diagram: .... The  vertices exist in the middle of the edges of the n-orthoplex.

D3 coincides with A3, and is therefore not a distinct root system.

D4 has additional symmetry called triality.

E6, E7, E8

The E8 root system is any set of vectors in R8 that is congruent to the following set:

The root system has 240 roots. The set just listed is the set of vectors of length  in the E8 root lattice, also known simply as the E8 lattice or Γ8.  This is the set of points in R8 such that:
 all the coordinates are integers or all the coordinates are half-integers (a mixture of integers and half-integers is not allowed), and
 the sum of the eight coordinates is an even integer.
Thus,

 The root system E7 is the set of vectors in E8 that are perpendicular to a fixed root in E8.  The root system E7 has 126 roots.
 The root system E6 is not the set of vectors in E7 that are perpendicular to a fixed root in E7, indeed, one obtains D6 that way. However, E6 is the subsystem of E8 perpendicular to two suitably chosen roots of E8. The root system E6 has 72 roots.

An alternative description of the E8 lattice which is sometimes convenient is as the set Γ'8 of all points in R8 such that
all the coordinates are integers and the sum of the coordinates is even, or
all the coordinates are half-integers and the sum of the coordinates is odd.
The lattices Γ8 and Γ'8 are isomorphic; one may pass from one to the other by changing the signs of any odd number of coordinates. The lattice Γ8 is sometimes called the even coordinate system for E8 while the lattice Γ'8 is called the odd coordinate system.

One choice of simple roots for E8 in the even coordinate system with rows ordered by node order in the alternate (non-canonical) Dynkin diagrams (above) is:
αi = ei − ei+1, for 1 ≤ i ≤ 6, and
α7 = e7 + e6
(the above choice of simple roots for D7) along with 

One choice of simple roots for E8 in the odd coordinate system with rows ordered by node order in alternate (non-canonical) Dynkin diagrams (above) is
αi = ei − ei+1, for 1 ≤ i ≤ 7
(the above choice of simple roots for A7) along with 
α8 = β5, where
βj = 
(Using β3 would give an isomorphic result. Using β1,7 or β2,6 would simply give A8 or D8. As for β4, its coordinates sum to 0, and the same is true for α1...7, so they span only the 7-dimensional subspace for which the coordinates sum to 0; in fact −2β4 has coordinates (1,2,3,4,3,2,1) in the basis (αi).)

Since perpendicularity to α1 means that the first two coordinates are equal, E7 is then the subset of E8 where the first two coordinates are equal, and similarly E6 is the subset of E8 where the first three coordinates are equal. This facilitates explicit definitions of E7 and E6 as

E7 = {α ∈  Z7 ∪ (Z+1/2)7 :  Σαi2 + α12 = 2, Σαi + α1 ∈ 2Z},
E6 = {α ∈  Z6 ∪ (Z+1/2)6 :  Σαi2 + 2α12 = 2, Σαi + 2α1 ∈ 2Z}

Note that deleting α1 and then α2 gives sets of simple roots for E7 and E6.  However, these sets of simple roots are in different E7 and E6 subspaces of E8 than the ones written above, since they are not orthogonal to α1 or α2.

F4

For F4, let E = R4, and let Φ denote the set of vectors α of length 1 or  such that the coordinates of 2α are all integers and are either all even or all odd. There are 48 roots in this system. One choice of simple roots is: the choice of simple roots given above for B3, plus .

The F4 root lattice—that is, the lattice generated by the F4 root system—is the set of points in R4 such that either all the coordinates are integers or all the coordinates are half-integers (a mixture of integers and half-integers is not allowed).  This lattice is isomorphic to the lattice of Hurwitz quaternions.

G2

The root system G2 has 12 roots, which form the vertices of a hexagram. See the picture above.

One choice of simple roots is (α1, β = α2 − α1) where  
αi = ei − ei+1 for i = 1, 2 is the above choice of simple roots for A2.

The G2 root lattice—that is, the lattice generated by the G2 roots—is the same as the A2 root lattice.

The root poset

The set of positive roots is naturally ordered by saying that  if and only if  is a nonnegative linear combination of simple roots. The Hasse graph is a visualization of the ordering of the root poset.

See also
ADE classification
Affine root system
Coxeter–Dynkin diagram
Coxeter group
Coxeter matrix
Dynkin diagram
root datum
Semisimple Lie algebra
Weights in the representation theory of semisimple Lie algebras
Root system of a semi-simple Lie algebra
Weyl group

Notes

References

. The classic reference for root systems.

Further reading

External links

Euclidean geometry
Lie groups
Lie algebras